GSK1360707F is a potent and selective triple reuptake inhibitor. It is chemically related to amitifadine and NS-2359 (GSK-372,475).  Until recently, it was under development for the treatment of major depressive disorder; its development was put on hold for strategic reasons.

Synthesis

BOC Protecting group.
Enolization and trapping with triflate group (cf Comins' reagent).
Suzuki reaction
Reduction (only 1 mol eq. LAH because N-BOC can be reduced to N-Me)
Trifluoroacetic acid (TFA) removal of protecting group.
Simmons–Smith reaction cyclopropanation.
Williamson ether synthesis (c.f. NS patents & paxil).

Transporter occupancy 
GSK1360707F has recently (2013) been tested on baboons (Papio anubis) & humans for transporter occupancy using PET.

See also 
NS-2359

References 

Serotonin–norepinephrine–dopamine reuptake inhibitors